India participated in the 2016 South Asian Games in Guwahati and Shillong, India from 5 to 16 February 2016.

Medal summary
India won 188 gold medals and a total of 308 medals.

Medals by sports

Medals by Date

Medalists

Archery

Men

Recurve

Compound

Women

Recurve

Compound

Mixed
Recurve

Compound

Athletics

Key
Q = Qualified for the next round
q = Qualified for the next round as a fastest loser or, in field events, by position without achieving the qualifying target
NR = National record
N/A = Round not applicable for the event

Men
Track & road events

Field events

Women
Track & road events

Field events

Badminton

Men

1. Srikanth Kidambi,
2. Ajay Jayaram,
3. H S Prannoy,
4. B. Sai Praneeth,
5. Manu Attri,
6. B. Sumeeth Reddy,
7. Akshay Dewalkar,
8. Pranav J Chopra

Team:

Singles:

Doubles:

Women
1. P. V. Sindhu
2. P. C. Thulasi
3. Ruthvika Shivani
4. Jwala Gutta
5. Ashwini Ponappa
6. K. Maneesha
7. N. Sikki Reddy

Team:

Singles:

Doubles:

Mixed
Mixed doubles

Boxing

Men

Women

Cycling

Women 
Road:
Women's 30 Km Individual time trial

Women's 40 km Criterium Individual

Women's 40 Km Team time trial

Women's 80 Km Individual Road Race

Men 

Track:
Men's 40 Km Individual time trial

Men's 60km Criterium Individual

Men's 70 Km Team time trial

Men's 100 Km Individual Road Race

Field hockey

Men
Vikas Dahiya
Pankaj Kumar Rajak
Gaganpreet Singh
Chiyanna AB
Sukhmanjeet Singh
Nilam Sanjip Xess
Ajitesh Roy
Gurbaj Singh
Vikas Chaudhary
Mangal Singh Chahal
Manpreet Singh
Ajay Yadav
Ajit Kumar Pandey
Gagandeep Singh
PL Thimmanna
Mandeep Antil
Pradhan Sommanna P.
Mohd Umar
Anup Amarpal Valmiki

Women
Yogita Bali
Sonal Minz
Jaspreet Kaur
Renuka Yadav
Gurjit Kaur
Hnialum Lalruatfeli
Sushila Chanu
M. N. Ponnamma
Ritu Rani
Deepika
Sonica
Preeti Dubey
Shyama Tirgam
Jyoti Gupta
Punam Barla
Rani Rampal
Neha Goyal
Soundarya Yendala

Preliminary

Football

Men
Group-A

Semifinal

Final

Women
Goalkeepers: Aditi Chauhan, Roshini Devi, Panthoi Chanu,

Defenders: Ashalata Devi, Radharani Devi, Manisa Panna, Supriya Routray, Umapati Devi, Dalima Chibber,

Midfielders: Bembem Devi, Premi Devi, Sangita Basfore, Margaret Devi, Sasmita Malik, Prameshwori Devi, Sanju,

Forwards: Bala Devi, Dangmei Grace, Kamala Devi, Pyari Xaxa

Group Matches

Semifinal

Final

Handball

Men

Women

Judo

Men

Women

Kabbadi

Men

Women

Kho-Kho

Men

Shooting

Men

Women

Squash

Men
Saurav Ghosal, Harinder Pal Sandhu, Kush Kumar and Ravi Dixit

Individual

Team

Women
Joshna Chinappa, Dipika Karthik, Sunayna Kuruvilla and Akanksha Salunkhe

Individual

Team

Swimming

Men

Women

Table tennis

Men
 Anthony Amalraj,
 Sathiyan Gnanasekaran, 
 Devesh Karia,
 Sanil Sankar Shetty 
 Sudhanshu Grover
Team:

Singles:

Doubles:

Women
 Manika Batra,
 Mouma Das,
 Pooja Vijay Sahasrabudhe,
 Madhurika Patkar
 Shamini Kumaresan
Team:

Singles:

Doubles:

Mixed
Mixed doubles

Taekwondo

Men

Women

Tennis

Men
Singles

Doubles

Women
Singles

Doubles

Mixed
Mixed doubles

Triathlon

Men
Individual

Women
Individual

Mixed
Mixed Relay

Volleyball

Men
1.G.R. Vaishnav,
2.Naveen Raja Jacob,
3.Ukkrapandian,
4.Lavmeet Kataria,
5.Karthik,
6.Prabagaran,
7.Prabakaran Pattani,
8.Hardeep Singh,
9.Gurinder Singh,
10.Vinit Kumar,
11.Ranjit Singh, 
12.C. Jerome Vinith
Head coach: G.E. Sridharan.

Women
1.Tiji Raju,
2.S. Rekha,
3.M. Sruthi,
4.K.S. Jini, 
5.Anusri Ghosh,
6.K.S. Smisha,
7.Nirmal,
8.M.S. Poornima,
9.Preeti Singh,
10.Priyanka Khedkar,
11.Terin Antony,
12.P. Narmada
Head coach: R.P. Tailor

Weightlifting

Women

Men

Wrestling

Men

Women

Wushu

Men

Women

References

Nations at the 2016 South Asian Games
2016